Gothic Sports is a German manga-styled book created by Anike Hage. The protagonist is a young girl named Anya, who is adjusting to her new school. When Anya tries to join various sports teams, she is repeatedly rejected. Because of this, she forms her own soccer team, thus creating the first Gothic Lolita soccer team. The book was licensed by Tokyopop for English distribution, with the first volume released on July 1, 2007. Soon after, other volumes were released.

Release date
 Volume 1 was released on July 1, 2007
 Volume 2 was released on October 1, 2007.
 Volume 3 was released on January 8, 2008.
 Volume 4 was released in January 2010.
 Volume 5 was released in Germany in April 2010. It was released in Spain by Dreamers.

Plot
Anya arrives at Lucrece High School on her first day and is hoping to play for one of the sports teams. She first tries to play basketball, but is rejected by the coaches and other students because of her height. Anya then decides to join the soccer team. There, she meets Julia, who is already a member of the team but never gets to play any games, because the school team is one of the best and the coach is worried that having girls on the team would weaken it.

This discrimination inspires Anya to go to the principal of the school, who agrees to let her form her own team with one condition; Her team must have a test match against the school's official team. Anya, with help from her friends, forms a team consisting of the "misfits" of the school. She starts with Luise (commonly called Loo), whom she has known since elementary school, and Felicitas (commonly called Filiz) who is known for her Gothic Lolita style of dress. Filiz's style gets the team noticed, especially when she designs the team uniforms which have a clear Gothic Lolita style: mostly black with a dark maroon stripe down one side and a smaller stripe crossing it along the top. The boys on the team have similar red stripes on their shorts, while the girls wear skirts with the red stripes along with striped stockings with lace. The girls also wear lace collars.

The team eventually attracts 11 members needed to form a team. The side consists of Delia, who acts as the coach of the team and has a close personal relationship with the coach of the official school team (in the third book he is revealed to be her ex-boyfriend); Leon, who Anya has hated since elementary ever since he accidentally killed her hamster; Kevin, a musician known for his temper; Fraternal twins Alexia and Hannes, who joined in support of Anya after she was denied the chance to join the basketball team; Ellis, who is not as strong as the other players; and Olga, who likes Renaissance fashion.

Throughout the graphic novels, there are some unidentified characters in the stories. The group is made up of a small number of students (chiefly a group of three). They are presumed to be from another school, who are interested in facing Anya's team in a match. These characters have been seen watching, taking pictures of, and discussing the fledgling team. Their identities have not yet been revealed.

The books follow the school team, named "Gothic Sports", as they train and try to compete against other school football teams, including their main rivals, Lucrece High School's official team.

Media

Graphic novels
The series is also licensed in French by Soleil Manga, and in Finland by Pauna Media Group. and in Denmark by Carlsen.

References 

2007 comics debuts
Association football in anime and manga
German comic strips
Gothic fashion